The following is a list of all of the active power stations in Hong Kong.

Former power stations
The following is a list of all of the former power stations in Hong Kong.

See also

 Electricity sector in Hong Kong

References

Power stations
Hong Kong
Power stations in Hong Kong